The Great Lady M Stakes is a Grade II American Thoroughbred horse race for fillies and mares age three and older run over a distance of six and one half furlongs on the dirt held annually in July at Los Alamitos Race Course in Cypress, California.

History

The event was inaugurated on 14 June 1941 as the Sequoia Handicap at Hollywood Park Racetrack and was easily won by movie mogul Louis B. Mayer owned filly Painted Veil in a time of 1:23 for the 7 furlong distance. 
During World War II the event was not run in 1942 and 1943 returning in 1944 in November as an event for two-year-old fillies over 6 furlongs. After the conclusion of the World War II the event was held in September in 1945. In 1946 Louis B. Mayer won the event for the third time with his three-year-old filly Honeymoon winning.

The event was not held from 1947 through 1958.

From 1959 the event was either held in April or in late May.

The event was reclassified as Grade III in 1986 and was upgraded to Grade II in 1990.

In 1979 the event was renamed to the A Gleam Handicap in honor of Calumet Farm's filly, A Gleam, whose five stakes wins in 1952 is the co-record for most stakes race wins in a single meet at Hollywood Park including the Milady Handicap in record time.| A Gleam was voted Hollywood Park's 1952 "Horse of the Meet."

In 2009, Evita Argentina became the first 3-year-old to win the A Gleam Handicap since Honeymoon did it in 1946.

With the closure of Hollywood Park Racetrack in 2013 the event was moved Los Alamitos Race Course and renamed to the Great Lady M Stakes in honor of the mare Great Lady M who won the 1980 A Gleam Handicap in an upset. Great Lady M earlier had equalled the track record winning the 1979 Orange Coast Handicap at Los Alamitos Race Course over 6 furlongs in 1:09. Great Lady M's success was more evident off the track as she was the dam of 1986 United States Horse of the Year Lady's Secret.

In 2021, the 2020 US Female Sprint Champion Gamine, set a new winning margin by ten lengths defeating four other runners as the short 1/5 odds-on favorite.

Records
Speed record: 
  furlongs: 1:14.48 – Finest City (2016)
 7 furlongs: 1:20.40 – A. P. Assay (1998) (Equaled track record)

Margins: 
 10 lengths –  Gamine (2021)

Most wins:
  2 – Marley's Freedom  (2018, 2019)
  2 – Somethinaboutlaura (2006, 2007)
  2 – Linita (1961, 1963)

Most wins by an owner:
 3 – Louis B. Mayer (1941, 1944, 1946)
 3 – John G. Sikura (in partnership 2006, 2007, 2011)

Most wins by a jockey:
 7 – Gary Stevens   (1986, 1988, 1990, 1993, 1995, 1997, 2005)

Most wins by a trainer:
 6 – Bob Baffert (2011, 2013, 2015, 2018, 2019, 2021)

Winners

Legend:

 
 

Notes:

† The event in 1985 was an exhibition race with four entries that had no wagering.

§ Ran as part of an entry

See also
 List of American and Canadian Graded races

External links
 2012 Hollywood Park Media Guide
 Ten Things You Should Know About the A Gleam Handicap at Hello Race Fans!

References

Graded stakes races in the United States
Grade 2 stakes races in the United States
Horse races in California
Sprint category horse races for fillies and mares
Recurring sporting events established in 1941
Breeders' Cup Challenge series
1941 establishments in California
Los Alamitos, California